Ciarán Kelly may refer to:
 Ciarán Kelly (footballer, born 1980)
 Ciaran Kelly (footballer, born 1998)